"Tighten Up Your Pants" is a song released by Australian country-techno act Audio Murphy Inc. featuring vocals by Melinda in November 1994. The song mixed electronic beats and yodelling peaked at number 39 on the ARIA Charts and number 3 on the Australian dance charts.

"Tighten Up Your Pants" was inspired by the chart success of "Cotton-Eye Joe" by Swedish group Rednex.

Track listings 
 Australian CD single/Cassingle (D 11877)
 "Tighten Up Your Pants" (Scotland Medley) (7" Version) - 3:48
 "Tighten Up Your Pants" (Scotland Medley) (12" Version) - 7:04
 "Tighten Up Your Pants" (Scotland Medley) (7" Original Version) - 3:25

 European Maxi single
 "Tighten Up Your Pants" (Little And Large 7" Mix) - 3:26
 "Tighten Up Your Pants" (7" Remix) - 3:38
 "Tighten Up Your Pants" (Little And Large 12" Mix) - 5:53
 "Tighten Up Your Pants" (12" Mix Original) - 6:56
 "Tighten Up Your Pants" (Little And Large Instrumental Mix) - 4:33
 "Tighten Up Your Pants" (7" Original Mix) - 3:23

Charts

References 

1994 debut singles
1994 songs
Festival Records singles